Lipa or LIPA (Cyrillic: Липа) may refer to:

Acronym
Liquid Isopropyl alcohol
League for Independent Political Action, a former American progressive political organization
Liverpool Institute for Performing Arts, a performing arts school in Liverpool, England
Long Island Power Authority, a municipal subdivision of the State of New York
Aviano Air Base (ICAO:LIPA), a NATO base in Italy

Places

Asia 
Lipa, Iran, Gilan Province, Iran
Lipa, Batangas, a city in the Philippines
Archdiocese of Lipa

Europe

Bosnia and Herzegovina
Lipa, Kreševo, a settlement in Kreševo
Lipa, Livno, a village
Lipa, Tomislavgrad, a village

Czech Republic
Lípa (Havlíčkův Brod District), a municipality and village
Lípa (Zlín District), a municipality and village
Lípa nad Orlicí, a municipality and village
Česká Lípa, a town
Krásná Lípa, a town

Poland
Lipa, Jawor County, Lower Silesian Voivodeship
Lipa, Ząbkowice Śląskie County, Lower Silesian Voivodeship
Lipa, Łódź Voivodeship
Lipa, Przemyśl County, Subcarpathian Voivodeship
Lipa, Jędrzejów County, Świętokrzyskie Voivodeship
Lipa, Końskie County, Świętokrzyskie Voivodeship
Lipa, Stalowa Wola County, Subcarpathian Voivodeship
Lipa, Ciechanów County, Masovian Voivodeship
Lipa, Gostynin County, Masovian Voivodeship
Lipa, Kozienice County, Masovian Voivodeship
Lipa, Płońsk County, Masovian Voivodeship
Lipa, Przasnysz County, Masovian Voivodeship
Lipa, Pułtusk County, Masovian Voivodeship
Lipa, Chodzież County, Greater Poland Voivodeship
Lipa, Oborniki County, Greater Poland Voivodeship
Lipa, Pomeranian Voivodeship

Slovenia
Lipa, Beltinci, Municipality of Beltinci
Lipa, Dobrepolje, Municipality of Dobrepolje
Lipa, Lukovica, Municipality of Lukovica
Lipa, Miren-Kostanjevica, Municipality of Miren-Kostanjevica
Lipa, Zreče, Municipality of Zreče
Lipa pri Frankolovem, Municipality of Vojnik

Other places in Europe
Lipa, Estonia, a village in Rapla Parish
Lipa, Croatia, a village near Matulji
, a village in Negotino Municipality, North Macedonia

Other uses
Lipa (name)
Lepa (ship) (also known as lipa), traditional houseboats of the Sama-Bajau people
Dua Lipa, English singer and songwriter
Dua Lipa (album), 2017
Lipa (political party), a political party in Slovenia
The one-hundredth part of the Croatian kuna
Lipa, a diminutive form of Lipman
Lipa, a Slavic word for the European linden tree (Tilia spp.)
League for Independent Political Action

See also
Lippa (disambiguation)
Lypa (disambiguation)